Simon De Cuyper (born 30 October 1986, Leuven) is a Belgian triathlete.

At the 2012 Summer Olympics men's triathlon on Tuesday 7 August, he placed 26th.

References 

1986 births
Living people
Belgian male triathletes
Triathletes at the 2012 Summer Olympics
Olympic triathletes of Belgium
Sportspeople from Leuven
20th-century Belgian people
21st-century Belgian people